Micrixalus nudis is a species of frog in the family Micrixalidae.
It is endemic to the Western Ghats, India.

Its natural habitats are subtropical or tropical moist lowland forests and rivers.
It is threatened by habitat loss.

References

External links

Micrixalus
Endemic fauna of the Western Ghats
Frogs of India
Amphibians described in 1978
Taxonomy articles created by Polbot